Torrey may refer to:

 Torrey (name), including a list of people with the name
 Torrey, Utah
 Torrey, New York

See also
 , a supertanker wrecked off Cornwall in 1967 
 Torrey pine
 Torrey Pines High School
 Torrey Pines Golf Course
 Torrey Pines State Reserve
 Torrey Pines Gliderport